Benedetta Barzini (born 22 September 1943 in Porto Santo Stefano) is an Italian actress and model, daughter of Italian journalist and author Luigi Barzini, Jr. and his first wife, Giannalisa Feltrinelli. As such, she is the half-sister of Giangiacomo Feltrinelli, the Italian publisher and left-wing political activist.

Career
Barzini was discovered at age 20 on the streets of Rome by Consuelo Crespi in 1963; Diana Vreeland soon thereafter received photographs of Barzini and sent a telegram asking if she could come to Manhattan to shoot for American Vogue with Irving Penn. She did so, and within ten days, she was signed with Ford Models. She hence established a successful fashion career in New York City, working with other notable fashion photographers such as Ugo Mulas, Richard Avedon, and Henry Clarke. Barzini appeared on the cover of the first issue of Vogue Italia in November 1965, and became the first Italian model to be featured on the cover of American Vogue.

In December 1966, Barzini was named one of the "100 Great Beauties of the World" by the American fashion magazine Harper's Bazaar. She began training at the Actors Studio around that time, and in the process became romantically involved with, and later engaged to, New York poet and media artist Gerard Malanga, an early collaborator of Andy Warhol. He would dedicate various works to her, such as his Poems for Benedetta Barzini and The Last Benedetta Poems.

Barzini became friends with and muse to artists including Salvador Dalí, Lee Strasberg, Bert Stern, and Richard Avedon in the course of her career. She also started hanging out at Andy Warhol's Factory and was headed for the top rank of New York models, but decided to return to Italy in 1968 to act. She met Italian film director Roberto Faenza, and they married in 1969. On the night she gave birth to twins, Nini and Giacomo, Faenza left her. She later married graphic designer Antonio Barrese and had two additional children.

Activism and teaching
In 1973, Barzini left the modeling business to become a Marxist, member of the Italian Communist Party, and radical feminist organizer in Milan. As of 2008, she was teaching in at the Polytechnic University of Milan and New Academy of Fine Arts, also in Milan, and at the University of Urbino, lecturing on subjects such as problematic images of women in fine art and the mass media. She guest-lectured at academic institutions such as the Italian University for Design. She retired from teaching sometime in the 2010s.

Awards and honors
In 2017, Barzini received a gold medal for civil honor from the Milan City Council, in part for “destroying the stereotype of the brainless cover girl.”

In media

Barzini was the subject of Malanga's 30-minute experimental film In Search of the Miraculous (1967).

The 2019 documentary film, The Disappearance of My Mother, was directed by Beniamino Barrese, Barzini’s son. The film showed at the London Film Festival 2019, Sundance, and other festivals, events, and venues, charting in at the 32nd Annual European Film Awards.

References

1943 births
Italian communists
Italian socialists
Italian female models
Italian feminists
Italian Marxists
living people
Marxist feminists
people associated with The Factory
People from Monte Argentario
radical feminists
Italian socialist feminists
women Marxists